On-base plus slugging plus runs batted in (OPSBI) is a baseball statistic calculated as the normalized sum of a player's on-base percentage and slugging percentage added to their runs batted in. Former Major League Baseball general manager, Jim Bowden, created this statistic. Hall of Fame outfielder, Babe Ruth, holds both the single-season and career OPSBI records.

Formula
The basic formula is

where OBP is on-base percentage and SLG is slugging average. These averages are defined as:

and

where:
 H = Hits
 BB = Base on balls
 HBP = Times hit by pitch
 AB = At bats
 SF = Sacrifice flies
 TB = Total bases

Rewriting the expression to account for the different denominators yields the final expression for OPSBI:

Leaders

The Top 10 single-season OPSBI performances in Major League Baseball history:

The Top 10 MLB players in lifetime OPSBI through the 2013 season are (active players in bold):

See also

 On-base percentage
 Slugging percentage
 Runs batted in
 Sabermetrics

References

Batting statistics